Shane Gallagher is a musician who played guitar for rock/alternative band +44, punk band Mercy Killers, and formerly The Nervous Return.

Background
In 2005, Gallagher left The Nervous Return to join Mark Hoppus and Travis Barker (both of blink-182 fame) and guitarist Craig Fairbaugh to form +44. He was brought in as a replacement for  Carol Heller as guitarist in +44 after she left the band to start a family. In 2007, he officially became a member of The Mercy Killers and he went on tour with them.
Once +44 took a break so Mark and Travis could focus on the new blink-182 record, Shane worked on several different musical projects—including the Noise Chapter, which consisted of ex-members of one of his previous bands, called the Scrimmage Heroes—as well as the instrumental, acoustic act A Death To Stars.

References

American punk rock musicians
American punk rock guitarists
American musicians of Korean descent
Guitarists from California
Living people
+44 (band) members
Year of birth missing (living people)